The isle of Lundy has three lighthouses: a pair of active lights built in 1897 and an older lighthouse dating from 1797.

Old light
Foundations for a lighthouse on Lundy were laid in 1787, but the first lighthouse (now known as the Old Light) was not built until Trinity House obtained a 999-year lease in 1819. The  granite tower, on the summit of Chapel Hill, was designed by Daniel Asher Alexander, and built by Joseph Nelson at a cost of £36,000. To counter this problem, a Fog Signal Battery, equipped with a pair of 18-pound guns, was built about 1861; guncotton rockets replaced these fog signal guns in 1878.

The lighthouse had two lights: the lower a fixed white light and the upper a quick flashing white light, showing every 60 seconds (both lights were provided by Argand lamps fitted with parabolic reflectors). The flashing characteristic was an innovation at the time, however, the speed of revolution gave the impression it was a fixed light with no flashes detectable. This, combined with poor visibility, may have contributed to the grounding, at Cefn Sidan, of the La Jeune Emma, bound from Martinique to Cherbourg in 1828. 13 of the 19 on board drowned, including Adeline Coquelin, the 12-year-old niece of Napoleon Bonaparte's divorced wife Joséphine de Beauharnais. The following year the lower light was moved from a window part-way down the tower into a new lantern room at the base of the tower, with the hope that this would be less affected by fog.

Ongoing attempts were made to improve the quality of the main light. In 1842 a new rotating optic was installed: manufactured by Cookson & Co. of Newcastle, it combined dioptric lenses with mirrors and displayed a white flash every two minutes. (The following year, the dioptric section of the old 1842 optic was refurbished and installed in South Bishop Lighthouse.) Further attempts at improvement were made in 1889, when the frequency of the flash was increased to once every minute from once every two.

Owing to the ongoing complaints about the difficulty of sighting the light in fog, the lighthouse was abandoned in 1897 when the North and South Lundy lighthouses were built. The Old Light and the associated keepers' houses are kept open by the Landmark Trust.

New lights
The current Lundy North and Lundy South lighthouses were built in 1897 at the extremities of the island to replace the Old Light. Designed by Sir Thomas Matthews, both lighthouses are painted white and are run and maintained by Trinity House.

North lighthouse
It was originally lit by a 5-wick Trinity House oil burner, but this was replaced in the early 20th century with a Matthews triple-mantle (3×) petroleum vapour burner (PVB), which was itself replaced with a Hood single-mantle PVB in the 1920s. (Oil was lifted up from a small quay using a sled and winch, and then transported using a small railway (again winch-powered), the remains of which can be still seen). The 3.5-ton lens assembly was the first in Britain to be supported on a mercury trough; manufactured by Barbier & Benard of Paris, it was a first-order revolving four-panel optic in a 'bi-valve' configuration (i.e. 2 sets of 2 panels arranged back-to-back), which displayed a group-flashing characteristic, flashing twice every 20 seconds.

When built the North lighthouse was provided with a two-tone fog siren, housed in an engine house immediately to the north (seaward) side of the tower; it sounded through a pair of upright curved horns mounted on the roof and was powered by a pair of  Hornsby oil engines. The fog signal was replaced in 1929 with a more powerful 12-inch siren, installed along with a pair of conical resonators in a cast-iron turret, which was added to the engine room roof; twin Gardner T-type diesel engines were installed at the same time to drive the air compressors. New Ruston & Hornsby diesel engines were installed in 1969 to generate electricity for a new triple-frequency electric fog signal, which sounded two blasts every thirty seconds from a curved stack of 72 Tannoy speakers built on to the front of the engine house; it was decommissioned in 1988.

In 1971 the lighthouse was converted to electricity, and the old lamp and optic were decommissioned; they were replaced by a discharge bulb, fed from the generators, and a 4th-order revolving optic mounted on an AGA gearless pedestal. In 1976 the keepers were withdrawn and the light was monitored from the South lighthouse until 1985, when it was fully automated. The North lighthouse was further modernised in 1991 and converted to solar power; in place of the light in the tower a small rotating lantern (an 'Orga Rml 302 SA rotating beacon with 6 position lampchanger') was mounted on top of the old fog horn building, producing a quick white flash every 15 seconds. Between 2019 and 2020 the lighthouse building underwent a major refurbishment, in the course of which the light (provided by a new LED lamp arrangement) was returned to the lantern of the tower.

South lighthouse

When built, equipment from the old Lundy Lighthouse (including the 1857 optic) was reused in this tower, where it remained in use until 1962. It displayed a single flash every 30 seconds.

In contrast to the North, the South lighthouse sounded an explosive fog signal; initially discharged manually from the lantern gallery, in 1908 a small building was constructed (where there is now a helicopter pad) containing an automated apparatus provided by the Clockwork Explosive Fog Signal Company of Victoria. It remained in use until 1964 when it was replaced by a set of 'supertyfon' air horns, eight in number, placed in a housing on top of the lantern. Thirty years later, just prior to the automation of the South light, the supertyfon was itself replaced by an electric emitter, installed alongside it.

It can be seen as a small white dot from Hartland Point,  to the southeast. It was automated and converted to solar power in 1994. A small (fourth-order) optic, in use since 1962, was removed at this time; (in 2001 it was installed in Dungeness Lighthouse where it remains in use). In its place in the lantern room there is now a smaller rotating beacon manufactured by the Dutch firm Orga.

References

Lighthouses in Devon
Lundy